Hermann Stövesand (1906–1992) was a German stage actor. He also appeared in several East German films in the post-war era.

Selected filmography
 The Last Year (1951)
 The Axe of Wandsbek (1951)
 The Condemned Village (1952)
 Bear Ye One Another's Burden (1988)

References

Bibliography
 Dieter Reimer. DEFA-Stars. Militzke Verlag, 2004.

External links

1906 births
1992 deaths
German male film actors
German male stage actors
People from Bochum